Sant'Eusanio Forconese is a comune and town in the province of L'Aquila in the Abruzzo region of southern Italy.

Sant'Eusanio is a  hamlet nestled in the mountains of central Italy.

Main sights
 Castle

References